L'Express is a French weekly news magazine headquartered in Paris. The weekly stands at the political centre in the French media landscape, and has a lifestyle supplement, L'Express Styles, and a job supplement, Réussir.

History and profile
L'Express was co-founded in 1953 by Jean-Jacques Servan-Schreiber, future president of the Radical Party, and Françoise Giroud, who had earlier edited ELLE and went on to become France's first minister of women's affairs in 1974 and minister of culture in 1976.  When founded during the First Indochina War, it was modelled on the US magazine Time and the German magazine Der Spiegel. L'Express is published weekly.

The magazine was supportive of the policies of Pierre Mendès-France in Indochina, and in general had a left-of-centre orientation. The magazine opposed the war in Algeria, and especially the use of torture. In March 1958, as a result of an article of Jean-Paul Sartre reviewing the book La Question by Henri Alleg, the magazine was prevented from being published by the French Government. In order to resume publication, L'Express had to print a new issue without the incriminated article. François Mauriac was a regular contributor with his Bloc-Notes column but left L'Express when Charles De Gaulle returned to power.

In 1964, a number of journalists, including Jean Daniel and André Gorz, quit L'Express to found Le Nouvel Observateur. Servan-Schreiber turned L'Express into a less politically engaged publication, and the circulation rose from 150,000 to 500,000 copies in three years.

In 1971, as a result of Servan-Schreiber's political activities as a deputy of the Radical Party, nine journalists of L'Express, including Claude Imbert, left the magazine and created Le Point to counter what they perceived as the "current breed of French intellectuals in the press and elsewhere, with their leftist dogmas and complacent nihilism".

In 1977, Servan-Schreiber sold his magazine to Jimmy Goldsmith.

Jean-François Revel became director in October 1978. He was replaced by Yves Cuau in May 1981. The same year the magazine had a circulation of 507,000 copies.

In 1986, L'Express started a news exchange cooperation with the Belgium-based French language news magazine Le Vif/L’Express.

In 1987, L'Express had a circulation of 555,000 copies and it was 554,000 copies in 1988. The same year the magazine was sold to C. G. E. Yann de l'Ecotais became the new director and served in the post until 1994 when he was replaced by Christine Ockrent. In 1995, L'Express was sold to CEP communications, a filial of Havas. Then Denis Jeambar became the new director.

In 1998, after Vivendi took control of Havas, the magazine returned under its control. After the collapse of Vivendi, L'Express was sold in 2002 to Socpresse (80% owned by Dassault Group).

In the period of 2001-2002 L'Express had a circulation of 424,000 copies. It was 548,195 copies during the period of 2003-2004.

L'Express was acquired by Roularta Media Group in 2006. The same year the circulation of the magazine was 547,000 copies.

In 2014, Roularta sold L'Express to the Franco-Israeli billionaire and media-entrepreneur Patrick Drahi's Altice.

In 2020, L'Express had a circulation of 173,053 copies.

Journalists

 Raymond Aron
 Jean-François Revel
 André Gorz
 Franz-Olivier Giesbert
 Christophe Barbier
 Christian Makarian

References

External links

1953 establishments in France
Centre-right newspapers
Conservative media in France
French-language magazines
French news websites
Liberal conservatism
Liberal media in France
Magazines established in 1953
Magazines published in Paris
News magazines published in France
Weekly magazines published in France
Weekly news magazines